Peter E. Hook (born 1942) is professor emeritus in the Department of Asian Languages and Cultures at the University of Michigan.

Biography

Hook was born in southwestern Connecticut and attended public and private school in northeastern Ohio. He graduated from Harvard College in 1964 and went to India as a member of the American Peace Corps before earning his PhD in Indo-Aryan linguistics at the University of Pennsylvania. He is married to Prof. Hsin-hsin Liang who directs the Chinese language program at the University of Virginia. They have a daughter Leise and a son Lawrence.

Academic work

Hook's academic  interest has been in the linguistic description of languages belonging to the Indo-Aryan family in South Asia, and more broadly in their place in Masica's Indo-Turanian linguistic area. At  Michigan, he taught Hindi at all levels, occasionally other South Asian languages, along with courses in linguistics and South Asian literature for three and a half decades, and published on both Indo-Aryan languages and linguistics.

His chief contributions are The Compound Verb in Hindi and numerous articles on the compound verb and other syntactic and semantic phenomena in western Indo-Aryan languages and dialects spoken in North India, West India, and Pakistan: Kashmiri, Marathi, Gujarati, Rajasthani, Shina, and Sanskrit. After Jules Bloch in his La Formation de la Langue Marathe, Hook was the first to realize that Kashmiri, not unlike German, has V2 word order. More recent publications have refined the notion of South Asia as a linguistic area as first adumbrated by Murray Emeneau and - with the addition of Central Asia and Eastern Asia - expanded by Colin Masica.

Publications 

Semantic neutrality in complex predicates in East and South Asian languages. (with Prashant Pardeshi and Hsin-Hsin Liang).  In Linguistics 50: 605-632.
Searching for the Goddess: A study of sensory and other impersonal causative expressions in the Shina of Gilgit. (with Muhammad Amin Zia).  Yearbook of South Asian Languages and Linguistics 2005.  Berlin: Mouton de Gruyter. pp 165–188. 
Where do Compound Verbs Come from? And where are they Going?. In Bhaskararao, P., and K.V. Subbarao, Eds. South Asia yearbook 2001: Papers from the symposium on South Asian languages: contact, convergence and typology. Delhi: SAGE Publications. Pp. 101–30.
The compound verb in Chinese and Hindi-Urdu and the plausibility of macro linguistic areas. (with Hsin-hsin Liang). In Old and New Perspectives on South Asian Languages: Grammar and Semantics, Colin Masica, Ed.  Delhi: Motilal Banarsidass.  pp. 105–126. 
Kesar of Layul: A Central Asian Epic in the Shina of Gultari. In Studies in Pakistani Popular Culture.  Wm. Hanaway and Wilma Heston, Eds. Lahore: Sang-e-Meel and Lok Virsa. pp. 121–183. 
The Emergence of Perfective Aspect in Indo-Aryan.  In Approaches to Grammaticalization. Vol. 2.  B. Heine and E. Traugott, Eds.  Amsterdam and Philadelphia: John Benjamins.  pp. 59–89. , 9789027228994
A Note on Expressions of Involuntary Experience in the Shina of Skardu.  Bulletin of the School of Oriental and African Studies 53:77-82.
The Marriage of Heroines and the Definition of a Literary Area in South and Central Asia.  In Aryan and Non-Aryan in India, M. M. Deshpande and P. E. Hook, Eds., Karoma. 1979.  pp. 35–54. 
Linguistic Areas: Getting at the Grain of History.  In Festschrift for Henry Hoenigswald, On the Occasion of his Seventieth Birthday.  George Cardona and Norman H. Zide, Eds. Tuebingen: Gunter Narr Verlag.  pp. 155–168. , 9783878083658
Hindi Structures: Intermediate Level. Ann Arbor: Center for South and Southeast Asian Studies, University of Michigan. 1979. 
The Compound Verb in Hindi.  Ann Arbor: Center for South and Southeast Asian Studies, University of Michigan. 1974.

References

External links 

Competition between vectored verbs and factored verbs (複合動詞における Vector 動詞と Factor 動詞の競合について) 
Manetta, Emily. 2011. Peripheries in Kashmiri and Hindi-Urdu: The Syntax of Discourse-driven Movement. John Benjamins. 

Linguists from the United States
Verb-second languages
Kashmiri language
American Indologists
Living people
1942 births
Harvard University alumni
University of Michigan faculty
University of Pennsylvania alumni